The LAV 6, sometimes written as LAV 6.0 or LAV VI, is the fourth generation of LAV, and is based on the LAV III. The first vehicles were delivered in 2013 and after testing entered service in 2016. The Canadian Army plans to replace its entire LAV fleet of various LAV II and LAV III variants with the LAV 6. The vehicle is being acquired in two main variants: a fighting vehicle equipped with the 25mm cannon seen on the LAV II and LAV III, and a support variant labelled the Armoured Combat Support Vehicle (ACSV).

History
In July 2009, the Canadian Department of National Defence announced that $5 billion would be spent to enhance, replace and repair the Army's armoured vehicles. Part of the spending would be used to replace and repair damaged LAV III's due to wear and tear from operations in Afghanistan. As many as one third of the Army's light armoured vehicles were out of service. The LAV III's will be upgraded with improved protection and automotive components. The Canadian Armed Forces has lost over 34 vehicles and 359 were damaged during the mission in Afghanistan. The Canadian Army has lost 13 LAVs and more than 159 were damaged by roadside bombs or enemy fire. Of the $5 billion announced, approximately 20% of it will be used to upgrade LAV III models. The upgrade will extend the LAV III life span to 2035. The remaining $4 billion is to be spent on a "new family of land combat vehicles". The Department of National Defence considered the purchase of vehicles meant to accompany the Leopard 2 and to sustain the LAV III into combat. The CV90, the Puma (IFV) and the Véhicule blindé de combat d'infanterie were the most likely candidates for the role. A contract of 108 with an option for up to 30 more was considered, but a combination of budget cuts and upgrades to the existing fleet of LAV IIIs have led the Canadian Army to cancel its order for 108 CV90s.

In October 2011, the Canadian government announced a $1.1 billion contract to General Dynamics Land Systems to upgrade 550 LAV III combat vehicles. The government said the upgrade is needed to improve protection against mines and improvised explosive devices (IEDs), which have been the cause of a number of Canadian deaths in Afghanistan. The improvements will also extend the service of the vehicles up to 2035 and will boost troop mobility. The upgrades include a new and more powerful engine, increased armour protection, steering and brake systems. The turret hatches on the LAV III would be made larger and improved fire control, thermal, day and low-light sights, and data displays. The first of 66 upgraded LAV IIIs was delivered on February 1, 2013. The success of the upgrade program and budget pressures led to the cancellation of the Close Combat Vehicle replacement program later that year.

In September 2012, the original contract valued to at $1.064 billion to upgrade the 550 LAV III's variants, an infantry section carrier, a command post, an observation post and an engineer vehicle to the LAV 6 configuration, was modified. This included an additional $151 million to upgrade 66 LAV III's to the LAV 6 with a LAV Reconnaissance and Surveillance System (LRSS) fitted.

In February 2017, GDLS – Canada was awarded a $404 million order to work on 141 LAV Operational Requirement Integration Task (LORIT) vehicles. This contract will upgrade the remaining LAV III fleet in the Canadian Army to the LAV 6 configuration. This brings the Canadian Army's LAV III Upgrade (LAVUP) program to a total cost of $1.8 billion.

Final completion and delivery of the Canadian Army's LAV III Upgrade (LAVUP) to upgrade the LAV III to the LAV 6 was expected to be completed by December 2019.

Variants

LAV 6 series:

 LAV 6 ISC (Infantry Section Carrier) - The basic IFV variant fitted with a turret and armed with a M242 Bushmaster, a coaxial C6 GPMG, and a roof mount for another C6 GPMG or C9A2.
 LAV 6 CP (Command Post) - The mobile tactical command variant which lacks a turret and instead has a raised roofline on the rear half of the hull. Armed with a C6 GPMG on a RWS (Remote Weapon Station).
 LAV 6 CE (Combat Engineering) - The engineering variant fitted with a crane at the rear of the vehicle and a dozer blade at the front of the vehicle. It also lacks the turret of the ISC variant and is instead fitted with the RWS (Remote Weapon Station) armed with a C6 GPMG.
 LAV 6 Recce (Reconnaissance Vehicle) - A reconnaissance variant meant to partially replace the Coyote in the recce role. Unlike the OPV variant the vehicle is almost identical to the ISC variant, just with the addition of equipment for the recce role.
 LAV 6 OPV (Observation Post Vehicle) - A forward observer/reconnaissance variant meant to partially replace the Coyote in the recce role. The vehicle is similar to the Recce variant but has a surveillance suite mounted on a retractable mast that can extend up to 5 m when moving and 10 m when stationary.
 LAV 6 SHORAD (Short-Range Air Defence) - A concept vehicle designed to meet the Canadian Army's air defense requirement, first displayed at CANSEC defence exhibition in 2018. The vehicle is armed with a roof mounted SAM launcher with 3 tubes fitted to the left side of the vehicle, overtop of the troop compartment. The vehicle lacked any form of RWS (Remote Weapon Station) for protection.
 LAV 6 CRV (Combat Reconnaissance Vehicle) - A prototype vehicle designed for the Australian Army's Land 400 requirement for a wheeled combat reconnaissance vehicle. The vehicle is fitted with an unmanned MCT-30 turret and a CROWS. The vehicle was unsuccessful in the competition with the  Boxer CRV being chosen instead.
 LAV III UP (Upgraded) - The original prototype(s) that took the LAV III and modified it heavily under the Light armoured vehicle III upgrade (LAVUP) program into what eventually became the LAV 6 ISC.

LAV 6 ACSV (Armoured Combat Support Vehicle) series (originally known as LAV 6 CSV):

 ACSV TCV (Troop/Cargo Vehicle) - A basic APC variant that replaces the Bison as a general purpose armoured personnel carrier which can also double as a logistics carrier depending on operational requirements. The vehicle is armed with a C6 GPMG on a RWS (Remote Weapon Station).
 ACSV AA (Armoured Ambulance) - A field ambulance variant meant for transporting wounded personnel, replacing the older MTVA and M113A3 Ambulance along with the Bison Ambulance.
 ACSV CP (Command Post) - A command variant that replaces the older Bison CP and M577A3 CP vehicles.
 ACSV MRT (Mobile Repair Team) - Replacing the older M113A3 MRT, the vehicle is fitted with both a winch and a crane, which are used for repairing and assisting with the recovery of LAVs in the field.
 ACSV FCV (Fitter/Cargo Vehicle) - Replacing the older MTVF, the vehicle is fitted with a crane to repair vehicles in the field.
 ACSV EV (Engineering Vehicle) - A engineer variant that is fitted with a hydraulic dozer blade. This variant also replaces the older MTVE.
 ACSV EW (Electronic Warfare) - This variant is similar to the TCV variant but has a electronic warfare suite fitted in the rear of the vehicle. This vehicle replaces the Bisons that had been converted for electronic warfare.
 ACSV MRV (Maintenance and Recovery Vehicle) - The recovery vehicle variant is fitted with a hydraulic dozer blade, a crane, two stabilizing support legs and a RWS armed with a C6 GPMG. This variant replaces the older MTVR.

ACSV
In August 2019, the Government of Canada announced its intention to purchase up to 360 Armoured Combat Support Vehicles (ACSVs), and that negotiations with GDLS - Canada had entered the final stages. Based heavily on the LAV 6.0/VI platform, the ACSVs will replace the Bison LAV and the M113 armoured personnel carrier (M113A3 & MTVL) fleets of the Canadian Armed Forces.

In September 2019, Public Services and Procurement Canada on behalf of the Department of National Defence awarded GDLS - Canada a CAD$2 Billion contract for 360 ACSVs, initial spare parts, manuals, training, and various vehicle add-on kits. The various add-on kits incorporated in the procurement include: add-on armour, mine blast & enhanced crew protection, laser warning systems, side protection and remote weapons station kits. The Department of National Defence stated that by procuring similar combat support vehicles in the CAF fleet offers the advantages of reduced training and sustainment costs, in addition to the availability of standard spare parts to fix vehicles quickly during critical operations. The vehicles are expected to support a wide range of operations, including domestic disaster relief and overseas peacekeeping missions. Subsequently, the ACSV will be available in eight variants to provide services such as: ambulances, vehicle recovery, engineering, mobile repair, electronic warfare, troop-carrying, and mobile command posts. Delivery of the first set of vehicles is expected in late 2020, with the last vehicles being delivered in 2025.

In May 2020, Kongsberg Defence & Aerospace announced that they had signed a contract worth NOK500 Million (CAD$73.6 Million) with GDLS - Canada for delivery of the newest generation of Protector Remote Weapons Stations (or RWS) to the Canadian Army. The Protector RWS is to be equipped on Canada's fleet of ACSVs. It was subsequently announced on June 1, 2020, that delivery of the first ACSVs was still on schedule for late 2020 and would not be delayed in spite of the COVID-19 pandemic.

In June 2022, the Canadian Government announced that it would be diverting 39 ACSVs to the Ukrainian Armed Forces as military aid from the order of 360 vehicles it had previously made for the Canadian Forces. Canadian officials stated that the vehicles along with spare parts would be delivered during the summer of 2022 and that the Forces would still receive a total order of 360 vehicles in addition to the 39 vehicles given to Ukraine. In early January 2023 the first ASCVs were spotted near the frontlines in Ukraine, after having begun to arrive since early October of 2022, with the vehicles previously having been in rear-area units for training on the vehicles. Ukrainian Media reporting on the vehicles also dubbed the vehicles with a new nickname, the “Super Bison” due to the lineage the ASCV series shares with the older LAV 2 Bison series which filled an almost identical role.

Operators
  | Canadian Army – 616 LAV 6, 360 ASCV (on order, only part of the fleet has been delivered)
  | Armed Forces of Ukraine – 39 ASCV (Nicknamed “Super Bison” by Ukrainian Media)

References 

Military vehicles introduced in the 2010s
Armoured fighting vehicles of Canada
Eight-wheeled vehicles
Mowag Piranha